PPWC may refer to:

 Pikes Peak Writers Conference, an annual publishing industry conference
 Public and Private Workers of Canada (formerly known as the Pulp, Paper and Woodworkers of Canada), a labour union based in British Columbia, Canada
 Pound for Pound World Championship, an unofficial Football World Championship